Prexaspes was a prominent Persian during the reign of Cambyses II (530–522 BC), the second King of Kings of the Achaemenid Persian Empire. According to Herodotus, when Cambyses ordered his trusted counselor Prexaspes to kill Bardiya (also known as Smerdis), the King's own brother, Prexaspes loyally carried out his order. Herodotus provides two versions of the murder. After moving from Egypt (where he was stationed) to Susa, Prexaspes either killed Bardiya in a hunting field near Susa, or drowned him in the Erythrean Sea. 

After Cambyses' death, Prexaspes denied murdering Bardiya at first, but ultimately, in the words of Brill's New Pauly, "revealed before the assembled Persians the usurpation by the Magi (Patizeithes), called for their overthrow and committed suicide (Hdt. 3,66 ff.; 74 ff.)."

References

Sources
 
 

6th-century BC Iranian people
People from the Achaemenid Empire
Suicides in Iran
520s BC deaths